Robert Douglas (c.1630–1716) was a 17th and early 18th Church of Scotland minister who rose to be Protestant Bishop of Dunblane.

Life

He was the son of Robert Douglas of Nether Kilmonth, and grandson of James Douglas of Glenbervie, both relatives of the Earls of Angus. He was educated at King's College, Aberdeen, graduating MA in 1647, before beginning life as a preacher around 1650. He became the minister of Laurencekirk in the Mearns in January 1657, then Bothwell in 1665 and Renfrew in 1669. After the Restoration, King Charles II presented him to the parsonage of Hamilton, a position which came with the deanery of Glasgow.

In 1682 he became Bishop of Brechin, holding that bishopric for two years before being translated to the Bishop of Dunblane in August 1684. Douglas was Bishop of Dunblane until the abolition of Episcopacy in Scotland following the Revolution which then deprived Douglas and all other Scottish bishops of their sees. He died on 22 April 1716 in Dundee, at "the uncommon age of 92".

Family

He married twice. Firstly to Miss Irvine of Drum, by whom he had Rev Robert Douglas, minister of Bothwell. He next married Elizabeth Lammy daughter of Rev Sylvester Lammy of Glamis. Their children included:

Sylvester Douglas of Whiteriggs in the Mearns
William Douglas (1666–1746), later became Provost of Forfar
George
James
Katherine, married Dr George Reid of Dundee
Susanna, married Charles White of Dundee
A daughter, married Provost Dean of Forfar

Notes

References
 Keith, Robert, An Historical Catalogue of the Scottish Bishops: Down to the Year 1688, (London, 1924)

1716 deaths
Alumni of the University of Aberdeen
Bishops of Brechin (Church of Scotland)
Bishops of Dunblane
17th-century Scottish Episcopalian bishops
Scottish Episcopalian deans
Year of birth unknown
Members of the Parliament of Scotland 1685–1686
Members of the Convention of the Estates of Scotland 1689
Scottish Restoration bishops
Year of birth uncertain